Sevarkkodi is a 2012 Tamil film directed by R. Subramanian, starring Arun Balaji and Bhama and produced by Maharnth and Anand Reddy under Paneeyri Pictures banner. The film released on 9 March 2012 to positive reviews.

Cast
 Arun Balaji as Bala
 Bhama as Valli
 Pawan as Kali
 Manimaran as Soosai

Production
The famous festival Thiruchendur Soorasamharam was included in the film's shoot.

Soundtrack

The music was composed by C. Sathya and released on Think Music India.

Release
A critic from Behindwoods.com wrote that "Sevarkkodi is a fairly acceptable product that has its own inherent limitations. No point complaining about the production values here. But, the movie could have definitely done with a script that engaged constantly instead of sporadically. Also, a more performance by the male lead have shown a great work which made things much more interesting".

References

2012 films
2010s Tamil-language films